The Manes (so called by the Portuguese) or Mani or Manneh were invaders who attacked the western coast of Africa from the east, beginning during the first half of the sixteenth century. Walter Rodney has suggested that "the Mane invaders of Sierra Leone comprised two principal elements — a ruling élite originating in the southern section of the Mande world of the Western Sudan, and numerical forces drawn from the area around Cape Mount"; the first half of the sixteenth century would have taken Mande clans to the Liberian coast "from the region around Beyla and perhaps even from the hinterland of modern Ghana," followed by more incursions during the third quarter of the century, bringing both exploitation of the local peoples and improved military techniques and iron and cloth manufacture. "They also profoundly influenced religious and social patterns, particularly with respect to the secret societies of the area." Yves Person identified the early Mane leaders with the Kamara or Camara clan, "with traditions relating to the sea," from "the Konyan highlands around Beyla." George E. Brooks says they were originally led by "a woman of reputedly elite status from the Mali Empire named Macarico," who "left the Konyan highlands around the mid-1500s and traversed present-day Liberia in a south-southwest direction... Along the way the Mani allied with Sumbas, people speaking Kru languages."

Origin
The widest deployment of political and economic power in the Sudan before the seventeenth century was that stemming from Mandé initiative in the successive empires of Ghana and Mali (and to some extent of Songhai also). This had political consequences in the lands immediately to the west and south of the Mandé heartland around the upper reaches of the Niger and Senegal rivers. One result was the Fulani dispersion eastward past the farthest reaches of Mandé influence, and the other was the settlement of Mandé-speakers along the West Atlantic coast.

Expansion
Mandé-speakers moved west and south of their homeland as traders and conquerors. In the case of traders, an incentive was probably access to the supplies of salt obtainable from the coast. This move towards the coastlands led to a number of Mandé pioneers carving out kingdoms for themselves in emulation of the major model of Mali. There seem to have been two major axes for the Mandé expansion. One was along the line of the river Gambia, a useful artery for trade, which rises within a few miles of the sources of the Falémé, a major tributary of the Senegal, whose headwaters were in Mande occupation. The other, separated from The Gambia by the Fouta Djallon massif which the Fulani were occupying, ran south into modern Sierra Leone close by the Susu settlement. In both areas, political organizations were established under rulers called farimas. Initially they paid tribute to Mali, and even after the decline of the Mali power in the later fifteenth century, they maintained some idea of its previous supremacy.

Conquest

A final Mandé contribution to the ethnic and political geography of the West Atlantic lands came when these were invaded from the east during the first half of the sixteenth century by marauding bands of conquerors called Manneh. How they came to be advancing parallel to the coast from the east is uncertain. Sources cannot take them back further than about the middle of the Liberian coastline. But there is a Mane tradition, recorded in writing about 1625, to the effect that they first reached the coast close by a Portuguese fortress. This, it seems, can only have been on the Gold Coast (i.e. the coast of modern Ghana) some 600 miles further east. There is no corroboration for this either in Portuguese records (but these are notoriously defective for the period), or in the surviving traditions of modern Ghanaian peoples. It is possible a Mandé military contingent got there over the trade roads leading southeast from Jenne. Its decision to return home westwards along the coast could conceivably have been in some way connected with the rise of Songhai military power along the middle Niger. The Mandé as far west as the Gambia knew about other Mandé trading activities in the Gold Coast hinterland, so the territory was familiar.

By about the 1540s the Manneh [nyancho jong kende falla] were advancing westwards parallel to the coastline of modern Liberia, fighting each tribal group that they came across. They usually won. Following each victory, some settled as overlords of a new petty state, while others included local people as auxiliaries (called Sumbas) and, thus reinforced, to continue to further victories further west still. The Mane advance was only halted when, in the northwest of what is now Sierra Leone, they came up against the Susu, like themselves a Mandé people, possessing similar weapons, military organization and tactics.

Legacy

The end result of the Manneh conquests complicated the ethnic situation in the southern and southeastern borderland of West Atlantic territory. It seems to have been these conquests which established the Mandé-speaking Mende as the dominant stock of southern Sierra Leone. Further north, the Loko are also Mandé-speaking, but there is reason to believe that their ethnic base was originally of West Atlantic origin. Their neighbors, the Temne, though speaking a West Atlantic language, seem to have an aristocracy of Mane origin, and it seems that some chieftaincies among the Kru, the dominant stock of much of modern Liberia, may have arisen the same way.

Mandé influence in lands to the east of Liberia, in the modern republics of the Ivory Coast and Ghana, was primarily commercial, though as the speculation about the early history of the Manneh, this had consequences in the political sphere. It was connected with the expansion of the specialized class of Muslim Mandé traders called the Dyula, who seem in origin to have been connected with, if not identical with, the Soninke Wangara gold traders.

Notes

History of Africa
Mandé people